The women's 100 metres hurdles sprint competition of the athletics events at the 1979 Pan American Games took place at the Estadio Sixto Escobar. The defending Pan American Games champion was Edith Noeding of Peru.

Records
Prior to this competition, the existing world and Pan American Games records were as follows:

Results
All times are in seconds. Deby LaPlante's winning time of 12.90 seconds in the final was not registered as a Pan American record because of wind conditions.

Heats

Wind:Heat 1: +3.4 m/s, Heat 2: +2.8 m/s

Final
Wind: +3.9 m/s

References

Athletics at the 1979 Pan American Games
1979